Greatest Mrs.: The Best of Saigon Kick is a Saigon Kick compilation album.

Track listing 
 "What You Say"
 "Coming Home"
 "Colors"
 "The Lizard"
 "All I Want"
 "Love Is On The Way"
 "Hostile Youth"
 "One Step Closer"
 "Water"
 "I Love You"
 "Close to You"
 "Russian Girl"
 "Eden"
 "Everybody"
 "Hey! Hey! Hey!"
 "Suzy" (live)
 "What Do You Do" (live)
 "Ugly" (live)

Personnel 
 Matt Kramer: Lead Vocals on 1-7 and 15-18
 Jason Bieler: Lead Vocals on 8-14, Guitar on all songs
 Pete Dembrowski: Guitar on 12-14
 Tom Defile: Bass on 1-7 and 15-18
 Chris McLernon: Bass on 8-14
 Phil Varone: Drums on all songs

References

Saigon Kick albums
1998 greatest hits albums
Atlantic Records compilation albums